Liam Watt (born 21 January 1994) is a Scottish professional footballer, who plays as a midfielder for East Kilbride.

Youth career
He played for East Calder C.F.C. as a child before turning professional.

Professional career
Watt has previously played for Airdrieonians, Livingston, Brechin City, and East Fife.

Career statistics

References

1994 births
Living people
Scottish footballers
Airdrieonians F.C. players
Brechin City F.C. players
Livingston F.C. players
Scottish Professional Football League players
Association football midfielders
East Fife F.C. players
East Kilbride F.C. players
East Calder C.F.C. players